The 47th Daytime Emmy Awards, presented by the National Academy of Television Arts and Sciences (NATAS), honored the best in U.S. daytime television programming in 2019. The winners in leading categories were presented in a remotely-produced special aired by CBS on June 26, hosted by the panel of the network's daytime talk show The Talk. 

The NATAS originally planned to hold a ceremony over three nights for the first time on June 12–14, 2020, at the Pasadena Civic Auditorium in Pasadena, California. Due to the COVID-19 pandemic, the ceremony was cancelled. The nominations, originally scheduled to be announced on April 27, 2020, were also delayed to May 21.

Ceremony information
The 47th Daytime Emmy Awards were originally scheduled for the first time to be presented over three nights, instead of the traditional main ceremony and the separate Creative Arts ceremony, to honor its ever expanding set of award categories. On March 19, 2020, the NATAS postponed the ceremonies due to the COVID-19 pandemic. The NATAS then announced on April 28 that the awards would be presented at a date to be determined later, in a remotely-produced "virtual" format.

On May 20, the NATAS announced that the winners in leading categories would be presented in a special airing June 26 on CBS. It marked the first time that the Daytime Emmys were broadcast on U.S. TV since 2015 (after being relegated to a webcast), and the ceremony's return to both CBS and broadcast television for the first time since 2011. The special was produced by Associated Television International, which had produced previous Daytime Emmys ceremonies for CBS. The nominees were announced the next day on CBS's daytime talk show The Talk, whose panel would later be announced as hosts of the special.

Some of the additional award categories were announced simultaneously on Twitter, while others are planned to be announced separately later in July 2020. The Spanish language winners have yet to be announced and no clear date has been set.

Award changes
As part of several initiatives regarding gender identity, the NATAS decided to replace both the younger actor and younger actress drama categories with a single gender-neutral Outstanding Younger Performer in a Drama Series.

Winners and nominees

Nominations were announced on May 21, 2020. Winners in each category are listed first, in boldface.

References

047
2020 in American television
2020 television awards
Events postponed due to the COVID-19 pandemic
Impact of the COVID-19 pandemic on television